Massachusetts Avenue station is a rapid transit station in the South End and Symphony neighborhoods of Boston, Massachusetts. It serves the MBTA Orange Line, and is located at 380 Massachusetts Avenue. The station opened in 1987 as part of the renovation and relocation of the southern Orange Line into the Southwest Corridor. The Orange line runs parallel to the Northeast Corridor, which carries Amtrak trains and several MBTA commuter rail lines.

Station layout

Like all stations on the Orange Line, Massachusetts Avenue is accessible. The station has a single island platform serving the two tracks of the Orange Line. The main headhouse is located on the south side of Massachusetts Avenue; a pedestrian tunnel leads to a secondary entrance on the north side. An exit-only staircase at the south end of the platform leads to a footbridge connecting Gainsborough Street and Camden Street.

The MBTA plans to add a fare lobby and elevator at the footbridge, and to replace the existing elevator at the main entrance. Design work reached 30% completion in 2021 and 75% completion in 2022.

History
Chickering station, located northeast of Camden Street where it crossed the rail line, was opened by the 1870s. It was closed in 1896 because Back Bay station was under construction just  to the northeast. A 1919 petition to reopen the station was rejected by the state Public Service Commission.

The modern station opened as part of the Southwest Corridor project in 1987. The entire Orange Line, including Massachusetts Avenue station, was closed from August 19 to September 18, 2022, during maintenance work.

References

External links

MBTA - Massachusetts Avenue
MBTA – Elevator Accessibility Upgrades
Google Maps Street View: Massachusetts Avenue entrances, Gainsborough Street exit, Camden Street exit

Orange Line (MBTA) stations
Railway stations in Boston
Railway stations in the United States opened in 1987
Stations along Old Colony Railroad lines
1987 establishments in Massachusetts